Brooklyn may refer to one of two unincorporated settlements in Prince Edward Island, Canada:

Brooklyn in Kings County at 
Brooklyn in Prince County at

References

Communities in Prince County, Prince Edward Island